Adriaen de Grijef (1657 – 1722), was an 18th-century painter from the Northern Netherlands.

Biography
He was born in Leiden, the son of Jacques de Claeuw. He became a member of the Ghent Guild of St. Luke in 1687, and became a member of the Antwerp guild in 1700. He married in Antwerp and afterward moved to Brussels, where he lived and worked until he died.

References

External link

Adriaen de Grijef on Artnet

1657 births
1722 deaths
17th-century Dutch painters
18th-century Dutch painters
18th-century Dutch male artists
Dutch male painters
Artists from Leiden
Painters from Antwerp